The Stony Brook Seawolves baseball team represents Stony Brook University in NCAA Division I men's college baseball. Stony Brook currently competes in the CAA and plays its home games on Joe Nathan Field. Matt Senk has coached the team since the beginning of the 1991 season. The team has won the America East tournament six times in 2004, 2008, 2010, 2012, 2015, and 2019. In 2011, the Seawolves claimed their first America East regular season championship. Stony Brook has participated in the NCAA tournament on six separate occasions, winning its first game in 2010.

In 2012, the Seawolves clinched their second consecutive regular season championship and their fourth America East Conference baseball tournament championship, earning the league's automatic bid to the 2012 NCAA Division I baseball tournament. The team went on to win the Coral Gables Regional and the Baton Rouge Super Regional, becoming the first ever team from the America East Conference to advance to the College World Series.

History

Pre-Division I era (1966–98) 
Stony Brook first fielded NCAA–sanctioned baseball in 1966. The program struggled hard initially, posting only six winning seasons until the hiring of Matt Senk as head coach in 1991. Senk's leadership helped the team succeed at the Division III level, and Stony Brook finished 1995 with a 30–8 record and a trip to their first Division III NCAA Tournament. Stony Brook shortstop Joe Nathan was drafted by the San Francisco Giants in the sixth round with the 159th overall pick in the 1995 MLB Draft. He debuted for the Giants in 1999 as a pitcher, becoming the first player in program history to play in the MLB.

Early years in Division I (1999–2004)
Stony Brook began in Division I as a member of the Eastern College Athletic Conference. In 2002, the Seawolves joined the America East Conference. In 2003, Stony Brook advanced to its first America East Tournament title game, needing to beat Northeastern twice to win the championship. While they won 11–10 in game one, they were blown out 11–0, leaving them one game away from its first NCAA Tournament berth. In 2004, the fourth-place Seawolves upset first-place Northeastern 15–6 in the first round of the America East Tournament, and advanced to the championship game for a second straight year, this time defeating Maine 3–1 to win their first America East championship and advance to their first NCAA Tournament in the program's Division I history. Stony Brook was assigned as the fourth seed in the Kinston Regional, where they lost to host East Carolina 8–2 and Tennessee 1–0 and were eliminated from the tournament in two games.

Program on the rise (2005–11) 
After reaching their first NCAA Tournament in 2004, Stony Brook followed up with its first losing season since 1997, not qualifying for the America East Tournament. Stony Brook suffered another losing season in 2006 and a quick elimination from the America East Tournament in 2007. On December 6, 2006, Joe Nathan's No. 22 was retired, becoming the first retired number in Stony Brook athletics history. In 2008, Stony Brook finished 34–26 (14–10 America East) in second place in the regular season behind the Binghamton Bearcats. In the double-elimination tournament, the Seawolves beat UMBC and Binghamton twice to clinch their second tournament championship and advance to their second NCAA Tournament Regionals. In the Tempe Regional of the NCAA Tournament, Stony Brook lost 9–7 to Arizona State and 9–4 to Vanderbilt, resulting in another early exit from the tournament.

The 2009 season was less promising and the Seawolves ended the regular season in third place with a 29–23 (14–10) record. Stony Brook was ousted early in the America East tournament after consecutive losses against second-seeded Albany and fourth-seeded Vermont. In 2010, Stony Brook ended 30–27 (15–9), entering the tournament as the third seed but surprising with victories against Maine and consecutive victories against Albany to earn its third tournament championship. In the NCAA Tournament, the Seawolves played in the Myrtle Beach Regional. They lost to Coastal Carolina 6–0, but defeated NC State 6–2 in the loser's bracket to earn their first victory in the tournament. The Seawolves were then eliminated in a rematch with Coastal Carolina, losing 25–7.

In 2011, Nathan's donation allowed for the construction of a new venue, Joe Nathan Field, which was unsuitable for play entering the season. As a result, the Seawolves played their home games at Baseball Heaven in Yaphank, New York. Joe Nathan Field opened on May 20, 2011. Stony Brook won its first conference regular season title in 2011 after going 22–2 in America East play; the Seawolves ended with a program-record 42 wins and went 42–12. However, Stony Brook was upset twice in the America East Tournament, once by Albany and again by Maine to eliminate the Seawolves before reaching the title game, putting their record-breaking season to a stunning halt.

College World Series run (2012)

Stony Brook opened its 2012 campaign with a perfect 4–0 weekend at Thibodaux, Louisiana, with a pair of victories over Alabama State and Nicholls State in the Colonel Round Robin. The Seawolves' only losses in conference play came against East Carolina in a sweep, Kansas, Minnesota, Yale and Holy Cross. When conference play started, Stony Brook was 17–8.

Stony Brook went 21–3 in conference play, losing two games to Binghamton and one to Albany. The Seawolves continued to earn non-conference wins against Iona, Marist, Rhode Island, Central Connecticut and Fairfield in the middle of the conference season, entering the America East Tournament with a 43–11 record. Stony Brook beat Maine 14–6, Binghamton 7–4 and Maine 13–6 to win the conference title, advancing to the 2012 NCAA Division I baseball tournament with a 46–11 record, the best record in Division I. 

The Seawolves were the first team in the America East since 2002 to earn both the regular season and conference tournament championships in the same season. For the first time in the history of the program, Stony Brook found itself ranked, sitting at No. 25 in the Baseball America poll and No. 29 in the NCBWA poll.

Stony Brook traveled to South Florida to play in the Coral Gables Regional as the fourth seed. In the first game the Seawolves knocked off top-seeded Miami and went on to the winner's bracket. Following a loss to second-seeded Central Florida, Stony Brook beat Missouri State in dramatic fashion, striking out Luke Voit in the bottom of the ninth with the bases loaded in a 10–7 win. The Seawolves topped Central Florida 12–5 and 10–6 in consecutive days to win the regional and advance to face the LSU Tigers in the Super Regionals.

In a rain-soaked Baton Rouge Super Regional, Stony Brook fell in the first game to LSU, who started pitcher Aaron Nola, in an extra-innings affair that spanned two days due to rain. In game two, LSU started pitcher Kevin Gausman, who had closed out the game one victory hours before, with Stony Brook winning 3–1 behind a 127-pitch complete game. In a winner-take-all game three, Stony Brook won 7–2 and advanced to the 2012 College World Series in Omaha, Nebraska. The Seawolves were the second team to be the fourth seed in its regional and advance to the College World Series. Stony Brook was the first Northeast school to reach Omaha since 1986 and the first school from New York to do so since St. John's in 1980.

In the College World Series, Stony Brook's Cinderella run came to an end, losing to UCLA 9–1 and Florida State 12–2. Stony Brook ended the season with a 52–15 record, the most wins in college baseball, a No. 8 national ranking in the NCBWA poll and seven players selected in the 2012 MLB Draft, including outfielder Travis Jankowski being selected in the first round by the San Diego Padres.

Final America East years (2013–2022) 
Stony Brook followed up its College World Series campaign with a disappointing 25–34 season, finishing fourth in the America East and being eliminated in the first two games of the tournament. In 2014, Stony Brook won its third America East regular season title with a 35–18 (18–5) record. The Seawolves advanced to the championship round of the conference tournament in the winner's bracket but lost to Binghamton in both games, 4–3 and 8–7, and were eliminated.

Stony Brook won back-to-back regular season championships in 2015, reaching the finals from the winner's bracket again, and this time beat UMBC 16–11 to reach its fifth NCAA Tournament. Playing in the Fort Worth Regional, the Seawolves lost to North Carolina State 3–0, beat Sacred Heart 11–6 and were eliminated with an 8–3 loss to TCU.

In 2016, Stony Brook finished in third place in the America East, advancing to the tournament championship from the loser's bracket before falling to Binghamton. In 2017, Stony Brook finished in third again but lost two quick games in the playoffs. Stony Brook finished in fourth place in 2018, again reaching the championship game from the loser's bracket and losing to Hartford.

The Seawolves won their fifth regular season title and sixth America East Tournament title in 2019, beating Binghamton in the championship. In the NCAA tournament, Stony Brook was placed in the Baton Rouge Regional, scheduled to face LSU in a rematch of the 2012 series that sent the Seawolves to Omaha. LSU won the rematch 17–3. The Seawolves were eliminated from the NCAA tournament with a following 13–5 loss to Arizona State, which rostered future number-one MLB draft pick Spencer Torkelson.

The 2020 season was canceled on March 12 because of the COVID-19 pandemic. Stony Brook played 15 games to a 6–9 record. Stony Brook won its sixth regular season title in 2021, setting the America East all-time record for most conference wins in a season (25). Hosting the conference tournament at Joe Nathan Field, Stony Brook advanced to the championship but did so from the loser's bracket. Up 1–0 against NJIT, the game was halted due to rain and never resumed. The America East controversially awarded the title and NCAA Tournament bid to NJIT since the Highlanders were in the winner's bracket. 

Before the 2022 season began, the America East controversially prohibited Stony Brook from participating in the conference tournament because of the school's impending move to the Colonial Athletic Association.

NCAA Tournament appearances

Alumni in Major League Baseball
The following Stony Brook Seawolves baseball alumni have reached Major League Baseball:

 Joe Nathan (1999–2016)
 Tom Koehler (2012–2017)
 Nick Tropeano (2014–present)

Travis Jankowski (2015–present)
Daniel Zamora (2018–present)

Facilities

Joe Nathan Field

Joe Nathan Field, located in the north end of the Stony Brook campus, is the home field of Seawolves baseball. Known as Seawolves Field until 2002 and University Field from 2002 to 2011, the field was named after Stony Brook alumnus and six-time MLB All-Star relief pitcher Joe Nathan, who donated $500,000 for the construction of a new baseball field in 2008. As part of the renovations, a new FieldTurf was installed and dugouts were constructed. Additional donations allowed for a new scoreboard adjacent to the field.

The field's dimensions are 330 feet to left and right field, 365 feet to left and right center, and 390 feet to center field. Joe Nathan Field's capacity stands at 1,000 spectators. Stony Brook has hosted the 2011 and 2012 America East Baseball Tournaments at Joe Nathan Field.

Year-by-year results

Conference awards

America East Coach of the Year 
 Matt Senk – 2011, 2012, 2014, 2015

America East Player of the Year 
 Willie Carmona – 2011
 Travis Jankowski – 2012
 Kevin Krause – 2014
 Jack Parenty – 2015
 Toby Handley – 2017
 Nick Grande – 2019
 Evan Giordano - 2022

America East Pitcher of the Year 
 Gary Novakowski – 2007
 Nick Tropeano – 2010, 2011
 Tyler Johnson – 2012

America East Rookie of the Year 
 Jon Lewis – 2002
 Willie Carmona – 2010
 Brandon McNitt – 2011
 Cole Peragine – 2012
 Jack Parenty – 2013
 Cameron Stone – 2014
 Bret Clarke – 2016

See also
List of NCAA Division I baseball programs

References